Chinese Stock Exchanges may refer to the three main stock exchanges in mainland China:

 Beijing Stock Exchange
Shanghai Stock Exchange
 Shenzhen Stock Exchange

See also
Hong Kong Stock Exchange
Taiwan Stock Exchange
Bursa Malaysia